In Buddhism,  (Pali, Sanskrit) refers to the tree, flower and fruit of the Ficus racemosa (syn. Ficus glomerata).  In Buddhist literature, this tree or its fruit may carry the connotation of rarity and parasitism. It is also mentioned in Vedic texts as the source of wood for rituals and amulets.

The uḍumbara is also used to refer to the flower of the blue lotus (Nymphaea caerulea Sav.).

Buddhist Symbolism

Flowers

In some Buddhist texts, the flowers of the uḍumbara are enclosed within its fruit, as in all figs (see fig pollination and fig fruit).  Because the flower is hidden inside the fruit, a legend developed to explain the absence (and supposed rarity) of the visual flower: in Buddhism, the flower was said to bloom only once every 3000 years and thus came to symbolize events of rare occurrence. In early medieval Japan and possibly elsewhere this flower is believed to be capable of saving the lives of those dying from disease.  It is mentioned in the Heian Japanese classic Utsubo Monogatari.

Allusions to this symbolism can be found in texts such as Theravada Buddhism's Uraga Sutta (Sn 1.1, v. 5) and Mahayana Buddhism's Lotus Sutra, both described further below.

A recent sighting of this flower in 2010 was reported by a Chinese nun, who could distinguish them from assuming it to be lacewing eggs because they omitted fragrance of sandalwood.

Strangling figs
The uḍumbara is one of several trees known as "strangler figs" due to their often developing as seeds dropped on the branches of a host tree (by animals eating the fig tree's fruit) and, as the branch-borne fig tree grows, it envelops its host tree with its own roots and branches, at times crushing and replacing the host tree.  Based on this life cycle, the Mahārukkha Sutta (SN 46.39) likens "sensual pleasures" (kāma) to such fig trees, causing their human hosts to become "bent, twisted, and split" (obhaggavibhaggo vipatito seti).

Sanskrit literature
According to Bhikkhu Bodhi, Vedic sacrifices used uḍumbara wood for many different ritual purposes such as a ladle and post, as well as amulets made of uḍumbara wood are mentioned in Vedic texts.

It is mentioned as the name for the Ficus racemosa in the Atharvaveda, Taittiriya Samhita, Aitareya Brahmana, Shatapatha Brahmana and the Mahabharata. In the Hindu medical text, Sushruta Samhita, uḍumbara is a name given to a type of leprosy with coppery spots. In other texts, it is a measure that equals "two tolas".

Pali literature
In the Pali literature, the uḍumbara tree and its flowers are used concretely (as the tree beneath which a former Buddha gained enlightenment), metaphorically (as representative of a caste) and symbolically (evoking the insubstantiality of things and self).

Former bodhi tree
In both the Digha Nikaya and Buddhavamsa, the uḍumbara tree is identified as the tree under which the Koṇāgamana Buddha attained enlightenment.

Egalitarian emancipation
In the Majjhima Nikaya's Kaakatthala Sutta (MN 90), the Buddha uses the uḍumbara tree in a metaphor to describe how the member of any of the four castes is able to achieve the same quality of spiritual "emancipation" or "release" (vimutti) as a member of another caste:

Archetype of nonsubstantiality
In the Pāli Canon's Sutta Nipata, the uḍumbara fig tree is used as a metaphor for existence's ultimate insubstantiality (in English and in Pali):

In the post-canonical Visuddhimagga (XXI, 56), the uḍumbara tree is again used to symbolize the "emptiness of all formations" (sabbe sakhārā suññāti, Vsm XXI,53):

Lotus Sutra
The uḍumbara flower of the Ficus racemosa tree appears in chapters 2 and 27 of the 3rd century Lotus Sutra, an important Mahayana Buddhist text.  The symbolic nature of the uḍumbara is used in the Lotus Sutra to compare the unique occurrence of its bloom with the uncommon appearance of the Buddha and its doctrine in the world:

Thích Nhất Hạnh places the flower in the context of enlightenment:

Udonge
The Japanese word udonge (優曇華) was used by Dōgen to refer to the flower of the uḍumbara tree in chapter 68 of the Shōbōgenzō ("Treasury of the Eye of the True Dharma").  Dōgen places the context of the udonge flower in the Flower Sermon given by Gautama Buddha on Vulture Peak.  The udonge flower may be symbolic of mind to mind transmission between the teacher and the student, in this case, Gautama Buddha and Mahākāśyapa.

Udonge is also used to refer to the eggs of the lacewing insect. The eggs are laid in a pattern similar to a flower, and its shape is used for divination in Asian fortune-telling.

See also
 Ficus racemosa - includes tree's representation in Vedic/Hindu texts
 Ficus religiosa - another significant fig tree in Indian religions

References

Trees in Buddhism

ja:うどんげ
zh:优昙婆罗花